Wu Tao (13 November 1940 – 8 January 2023) was a Chinese diplomat.

Life and career
Wu Tao served as Chinese ambassador to Portugal from 1992 to 1994, then ambassador to Russia from 1998 to 2001, and ambassador to Australia from 2001 to 2003. He also served as Deputy Foreign Minister from 1994 to 1998.

Wu Tao died of COVID-19 on 8 January 2023 in Beijing, aged 82.

References

1940 births
2023 deaths
Diplomats of the People's Republic of China
Ambassadors of China to Australia
Ambassadors of China to Portugal
Ambassadors of China to Russia
Deaths from the COVID-19 pandemic in China